Arruabarrena is a Basque-language surname of Basque origin. Notable people with the surname include:

Lara Arruabarrena (born 1992), Spanish tennis player
Maite Arruabarrena (born 1962), Spanish-Basque opera singer
Mikel Arruabarrena (born 1983), Spanish footballer
Rodolfo Arruabarrena (born 1975), Argentine footballer

Basque-language surnames